Sewardite is a rare arsenate mineral with formula of CaFe2+3(AsO4)2(OH)2. Sewardite was discovered in 1982 and named for the mineralogist, Terry M. Seward (born 1940), a professor of geochemistry in Zürich, Switzerland.

Properties 
Sewardite is orthorhombic, which means in crystallographic terms, it contains 3 axes of unequal length, one "c" axis, and 1 "a" axis, and 1 "b" axis. The "c" axis runs vertically, and the "b" axis forms a 90 degree angle with the "c" axis; the "a" axis forms an angle that is less than 90 degrees.  Its class structure in the crystal system, orthorhombic, is mmm (2/m 2/m 2/m) - dipyramidal. Sewardite can form platy to compact anhedral to subhedral masses up to 0.3 mm in size in a single specimen.

In terms of its optical properties, sewardite is weakly anisotropic, which means the velocity of light varies depending on the direction through the mineral. Its color in plane-polarized light is dark red, and it does not exhibit pleochroism, which means it does not appear to be a different color when observed at different angles under a polarizing petrographic microscope.  Sewardite illustrates weak birefringence; birefringence is directly dependent on the material being anistropic, so since sewardite is weakly anistropic, it exhibits weak birefringence.

Occurrence
Sewardite has only been found at three locations, in the Tsumeb mine in Tsumeb, Namibia, Mina Ojuela, Mapimi, Durango, Mexico, and La Mur, Las Animas mine, Sonora, Mexico.   At the site in Durango, Mexico, it occurs as a dark, reddish spherules and rosettes of very thin, flaky crystals.

This newly discovered mineral (confirmed as a species in 1998) has been determined as rare, since only 1–2 mg of it were found in the Tsumeb mine.

References

Arsenate minerals
Calcium minerals
Iron(III) minerals
Orthorhombic minerals
Minerals in space group 66